The 32nd Edition Vuelta a España (Tour of Spain), a long-distance bicycle stage race and one of the three grand tours, was held from 26 April to 15 May 1977. While Maertens dominated the race he won the General Classification by less than 3:00. The domination was from his record shattering 13 stages wins including the first and the last. He also won the points classification. Pedro Torres won the mountains classification.

Teams and riders

Route

Classification leadership

Results
The 1977 Vuelta a España had several classifications. The most important classification was the general classification; this was won by Freddy Maertens.

Additionally, there were the points classification (also won by Maertens), the mountains classification won by Pedro Torres, and the intermediate sprints classification also won by Maertens. To be eligible for these secondary classifications, a rider had to finish in the top 25 of the general classification; this was relevant for the intermediate sprints classification, where Daniele Tinchella and Benny Schepmans had more points than Maertens, but did not finish in the top 25.

There was also an award for the best Spanish rider in the general classification, won by Miguel María Lasa, and a team classification won by Teka.

References

 
1977 in road cycling
1977
1977 in Spanish sport
April 1977 sports events in Europe
May 1977 sports events in Europe
1977 Super Prestige Pernod